Buxton is an unincorporated community in Panola County, Mississippi, United States.

Notes

Unincorporated communities in Panola County, Mississippi
Unincorporated communities in Mississippi